Arachnophobia is a 1990 American horror comedy film directed by Frank Marshall in his directorial debut from a screenplay by Don Jakoby and Wesley Strick. Starring Jeff Daniels and John Goodman, the film follows a small California town that becomes invaded by an aggressive and dangerous spider species. Its title refers to the fear of spiders.

The film was the first produced by Hollywood Pictures, a subsidiary of Walt Disney Studios. It released in the United States on July 18, 1990, to generally positive reviews from critics and grossed $53.21 million on a $22 million budget.

Plot 

In a Venezuelan tepui, entomologist James Atherton captures two members of an aggressive, newly discovered species of spider of prehistoric origin. The spiders lack sex organs, indicating that they are laborers or soldiers, thereby existing as a hive (atypical of spiders). A fertile male of the same species bites bedridden American nature photographer Jerry Manley, who has a severe seizure from the venom and dies. The scientist sends Manley's body back to his hometown of Canaima, California, unaware that the spider has crawled into the coffin.

Manley's desiccated body arrives at the mortuary of mortician Irv Kendall. The spider escapes from the coffin, is picked up by a crow and bites the bird. The crow falls dead outside the barn of Ross Jennings, a family physician who has moved from San Francisco to take over the practice of the retiring town doctor. Ross and his son both suffer from arachnophobia.

He is short of patients after Sam Metcalf, the elderly town doctor, hesitates about retiring. The Venezuelan spider mates with a house spider in the Jennings's barn. The domestic spider produces hundreds of infertile, drone offspring with their father's lethal bite, and they leave the nest after consuming her.

Ross's first patient, Margaret Hollins, dies after being bitten by one of the new spiders, and he doubts Metcalf's diagnosis of a heart attack. Another arachnid kills high school football player Todd Miller just after Ross conducted a routine team checkup, earning him the nickname of "Dr. Death". The next victim is Metcalf himself, who is bitten and dies in front of his wife.

With Metcalf dead, Ross becomes Canaima's town doctor. Knowing that Metcalf was bitten by a spider and an iota of an unknown toxin was detected in his body, he suspects that the town maybe infested by deadly arachnids.

Ross calls Atherton and asks him to help his investigation. The skeptical entomologist sends Chris Collins, his assistant. Ross and county coroner Milt Briggs order that Hollins and Miller be exhumed. They perform autopsies, and Chris confirms Ross's suspicion after he identifies bite marks. Ross and Chris catch one of the spiders in Metcalf's house the following day. When Chris mentions the new species discovered by Atherton, Ross realizes that the town's killer spiders and Atherton's discovery are related.

Atherton joins Ross, Chris, Milt, Sheriff Lloyd Parsons, and exterminator Delbert McClintock in Canaima, and they discover the spiders have a short lifespan due to their crossbreeding. Atherton tells them that the spiders are soldiers sent to eliminate potential threats for the male spider leading the colony, which he calls "the general". He learns that the general produced a queen and inbred with her to produce a second nest (guarded by the queen) which could produce fertile offspring, culminating in the species' next stage of evolution and worldwide dispersal.

Ross, Chris, and Delbert discover that one nest is in Ross's barn. When he destroys the nest, Delbert finds Atherton deadattempting to catch the general, he touches a strand of the web and is bitten by the male spider which then escaped. Chris gets the Jennings family out of their infested house, but Ross falls through the floor into his wine cellar: the spiders' second nest, guarded by both the queen and the general.

After he electrocutes the queen, Ross battles the general while he tries to burn the second egg sac (overcoming his fear of spiders by focusing on his need to stop them). Trapped by fallen debris as the general prepares to bite him, Ross stays perfectly still until the general is in position, then flings the spider into the fire. Despite being badly burnt, the general leaps out from the fire just as the egg sac hatches. Ross shoots the general with a nail gun, sending the flaming spider into the egg sac and destroying the nest. Delbert rescues Ross: with the general, the queen and the nests destroyed and the soldiers dying, the spiders' threat is over. Deciding that they missed their old life, the Jennings family returns to San Francisco.

Cast

Production 
Steven Spielberg was involved with Arachnophobia, with Frank Marshall (one of his earlier producers) directing for the first time. Spielberg and Marshall were the film's executive producers, and Amblin Entertainment received a production credit.

Marshall intended that the film would be reminiscent of Alfred Hitchcock's The Birds: "People like to be scared but laughing, like a roller coaster. No one wants to be terrified". Arachnophobia also bears similarities to the 1977 film Kingdom of the Spiders.

Jamie Hyneman of MythBusters said in Popular Mechanics that Arachnophobia was one of the first films on which he worked, and he often relied on simple magnets for effects. The film used over 300 Avondale spiders from New Zealand, chosen for their large size, unusually social lifestyle, and harmlessness to humans; they were guided around the set by heat and cold. The spiders were tested for "friendliness" with humans, and they were the ones selected for filming. These spiders did not like Lemon Pledge furniture wax or hot blowing air, so to make the spiders hit their "marks" during filming, a pathway was created using Lemon Pledge as the boundaries, and hair blow dryers were used to motivate the spiders to move. The result was the spiders avoided the Lemon Pledge and moved following the non-Pledged pathways created when the hot blow dryer air was aimed at them, hitting their marks precisely. On the unedited soundtrack the sound of multiple blow dryers had to be removed when the spiders followed their pathways. The large general and queen spiders were articulated models. For certain long shots, a huge living spider was used. Supervising sound editor Tom McCarthy recorded actual hisses from this spider for use in the final soundtrack. The shower scene where the spider jumps on Becky Beechwood's face was a "happy accident"; the spider was following the Lemon Pledge pathway and was supposed to jump onto her neck when the blow dryers were turned on full force. However, the spider landed directly on her face. Actress Cori Wellins, who had her eyes closed and was relishing her hot shower, realized what had happened and thought "oh God, this is PERFECT!" and just continued on until the spider crawled down onto her neck and upper chest before she opened her eyes and screamed. The cast actually adopted a few of the spiders and were not afraid of them in any way. After "cut" was yelled on the set, the cast would stop screaming and say "Oh, be careful, don't step on that one" and "don't forget that one over there", laughing the whole time after "cut!" was called.

Arachnophobia was primarily filmed in Cambria, California; the introductory and jungle scenes were filmed in southern Venezuela. The school scenes were filmed at Coast Union High School, with students and staff used in the football scenes and group events; players in the locker room were CUHS student athletes. For the sound effect of spiders being crushed, Foley artists stepped on mustard packages or potato chips. For the sound effect of the spiders crawling through the heating ducts, long fingernails were used on pieces of tin to create the scurrying sound.

Release and reception 
Arachnophobia was the first film released by Hollywood Pictures. Advertisers were uncertain if they should market it as a thriller or a comedy, and television commercials for the film called it a "thrill-omedy".

Box office 
Arachnophobia debuted at number three (behind Ghost and Die Hard 2), earning $8 million over its first weekend. The film was a financial success, grossing $53,208,180 domestically and an additional $30 million in video rentals.

Critical response 
In Leonard Maltin's Movie Guide, film critic Leonard Maltin calls Arachnophobia a "slick comic thriller", praising the acting with a caveat: "Not recommended for anyone who's ever covered their eyes during a movie". Writing for Newsweek, David Ansen compared the film to B movies "about the small town threatened by alien invaders", calling it well-made but "oddly unresonant". Roger Ebert of the Chicago Sun-Times said that the film made audiences "squirm out of enjoyment, not terror", and gave it three out of four stars.

Arachnophobia has a 93% rating based on 44 reviews at Rotten Tomatoes, with an average rating of 7/10. The website's critical consensus reads, "Arachnophobia may not deliver genuine chills, but it's an affectionate, solidly built tribute to Hollywood's classic creature features." On Metacritic, the film has a score of 67 based on 22 reviews, indicating "generally favorable reviews". Audiences polled by CinemaScore gave the film an average grade of "B+" on an A+ to F scale.

Some people interested in spiders protested against the film, believing that it tarnished the public's view of spiders.

Accolades

Home media 

Arachnophobia was released on VHS and LaserDisc in 1991, on DVD in 1999, and on Blu-ray on September 25, 2012.

Legacy 
Researchers at the University of California, Riverside named a newly-discovered worm species after Jeff Daniels' role in this movie. The worm,Tarantobelus jeffdanielsi is one of only two known worms known to infect tarantulas.

Merchandising 
The video-game version of Arachnophobia was released in May 1991 for Amiga, Amstrad CPC, Commodore 64 and DOS. Nicholas Edwards wrote a novelization of the film. Hollywood Comics (an imprint of Disney Comics) released a comic-book adaptation of the film, written by William Rotsler with art by Dan Spiegle. The characters in the comic adaptation bear little resemblance to those in the film.

An Arachnophobia soundtrack album was released on July 18, 1990. It included Trevor Jones's instrumental music from the film, dialogue excerpts, and songs such as "Blue Eyes Are Sensitive to the Light" by Sara Hickman, "Caught in Your Web (Swear to Your Heart)" by Russell Hitchcock, and "I Left My Heart in San Francisco" by Tony Bennett

Remake 
On June 2, 2022, it was announced that Atomic Monster Productions and Amblin Partners would produce a remake of the film. The film is expected to be co-produced by James Wan and Michael Clear, executive produced by Frank Marshall (who directed the original film), and written and directed by Christopher Landon.

See also 
 List of American films of 1990
 Cultural depictions of spiders

References

External links 

 
 
 
 
 
 

1990s American films
1990s comedy horror films 
1990s English-language films
1990 films
1990 directorial debut films
Amblin Entertainment films
American comedy horror films 
American natural horror films

Films about fear
Films about spiders
Films directed by Frank Marshall
Films produced by Kathleen Kennedy
Films scored by Trevor Jones
Films set in the San Francisco Bay Area
Films set in San Francisco
Films set in Venezuela
Films shot in California
Films shot in San Francisco
Films shot in Venezuela
Hollywood Pictures films
Prehistoric life in popular culture